120 is a film format for still photography introduced by Kodak for their Brownie No. 2 in 1901. It was originally intended for amateur photography but was later superseded in this role by 135 film. 120 film survives to this day as the only medium format film that is readily available to both professionals and amateur enthusiasts.

Characteristics 

The 120 film format is a roll film which is nominally between 60.7 mm and 61.7 mm wide. Most modern films made today are roughly 61 mm (2.4 inches) wide. The film is held in an open spool originally made of wood with metal flanges, later with all-metal, and finally with all-plastic. The film is attached to a piece of backing paper longer and slightly wider than the film. The backing paper protects the film while it is wound on the spool, with enough extra length to allow loading and unloading the roll in daylight without exposing any of the film. Frame number markings for three standard image formats (6×4.5, 6×6, and 6×9 [4:3, 1:1, and 2:3 aspect ratios]; see below) are printed on the backing paper.

The 220 format was introduced in 1965 and is the same width as 120 film, but with about double the length of film and thus twice the number of possible exposures per roll. Unlike 120 film, however, there is no backing paper behind the film itself, just a leader and a trailer.  This results in a longer film on the same spool, but there are no printed frame numbers.  Because of this, 220 film cannot be used in  cameras that rely on reading frame numbers through a red window. Also, since the film alone is thinner than a film with a backing paper, a special pressure plate may be required to achieve optimal focus if the film is registered against its back side. Some cameras capable of using both 120 and 220 film will have a two position adjustment of the pressure plate (e.g. the Pentax 6x7, Mamiya C220 or Mamiya C330) while others will require different film backs e.g. the Pentax 645 or Kowa Six.

The specifications for 120 and 220 film are defined in the ISO 732 standard. Earlier editions of ISO 732 also provided international standards for the 127 and 620 film formats.

Frame sizes 

120 film allows several frame sizes.

†User selectable on newer cameras, if a roll is only partially used then a "kink" may appear in the film where the roll touches rollers in a film back magazine and this may end up on a frame; this is not a problem when 15 exposures are used as the gaps between exposed frames is larger, nor if the camera is not used intermittently.

The 6×9 frame has the same aspect ratio as the standard 24×36 mm frame of 135 film. The 6×7 frame enlarges almost exactly to 8×10 inch paper, for which reason its proponents call it "ideal format". 6×4.5 is the smallest and least expensive roll-film frame size.

The wide 6×12, 6×17, and 6×24 cm frames are produced by special-purpose panoramic cameras. Most of these cameras use lenses intended for large format cameras for simplicity of construction.

Cameras using 120 film will often combine the numbers of the frame size in the name e.g. Pentax 6×7 (6×7), Fuji 617 (6×17), and many 645s (6×4.5). The number '6' in general, and the word 'six' are also commonly used in naming cameras e.g. Kiev 60 and Pentacon Six.

Other similar 6 cm roll films 

The 105 format was introduced by Kodak in 1898 for their first folding camera and was the original 6×9 cm format roll film. The 117 format was introduced by Kodak in 1900 for their first Brownie camera, the No.1 Brownie, 6×6 cm format. These formats used the same width film as 120 film, but with slightly different spools. The 105 spool has a much wider flange, similar to the 116 spool, while the 117 spool's flange is slightly narrower than the 120. The 105 and 620 spools also have much thinner flanges than the 117 and 120 spools ( vs. ); as a result, an unmodified 120 spool will not fit a camera designed for 105 film, such as a No. 1 Folding Pocket Kodak, as the overall length between the outside of the flanges is too long to fit the width of the film chamber.

The 620 format was introduced by Kodak in 1931 as an intended alternative to 120. Although mostly used by Kodak cameras, it became very popular.  The 620 format is essentially the same film on a thinner and narrower all-metal spool (the 120 spool core was made of wood at that time):

 105 2.509" (63.7 mm) width, 1.250" (31.8 mm) flange, 0.468" (11.9 mm) core
 117 2.470" (62.7 mm) width, 0.875" (22.2 mm) flange, 0.468" (11.9 mm) core
 120 2.???" width, 0.990" (25.1 mm) flange, 0.468" (11.9 mm) core
 620 2.???" width, 0.905" (23.0 mm) flange, 0.280" (7.1 mm) core

Hence the 620 is sometimes referred to as "small hole" 6×6 or 6×9 as opposed to 120 "large hole". The 620 format was discontinued by Kodak in 1995, but it is possible to rewind 120 film onto a 620 spool in the darkroom for use in 620 cameras. According to Kodak, the narrower metal spool allowed building smaller cameras. Nonetheless the 120 format cast-metal bodied Voigtländer Perkeo remains smaller than any 620 format camera.

See also 

 Fujifilm 120/220 Barcode System film
 616 film
 List of color film systems
 Category: Film formats

References 

Film formats
Kodak photographic films

sv:120-film